Mount  Johnson is a summit in the Olympic Mountains and is located in Jefferson County of Washington state. It is situated within Olympic National Park, and is set within the Daniel J. Evans Wilderness. It is the highest peak in The Needles range which is a subset of the Olympic range. The nearest higher neighbor is Mount Deception,  to the south. Mount Johnson is set in the eastern portion of the Olympic Mountains within the drainage basin of the Dungeness River. This location puts it in the rain shadow of the Olympic Range, resulting in less precipitation than Mount Olympus and the western Olympics receive.

History 
Mount Johnson was given its name based on what was believed to be the first ascent by Elvin Johnson and George Martin in 1940. However, new evidence has become available establishing that it was climbed by Scott Osborn, Joe Halwax, and John King circa 1935.

Climate

Mount Johnson is located in the marine west coast climate zone of western North America. Most weather fronts originate in the Pacific Ocean, and travel east toward the Olympic Mountains. As fronts approach, they are forced upward by the peaks of the Olympic Range, causing them to drop their moisture in the form of rain or snowfall (Orographic lift). As a result, the Olympics experience high precipitation, especially during the winter months in the form of snowfall. Because of maritime influence, snow tends to be wet and heavy, resulting in avalanche danger. During winter months, weather is usually cloudy, but due to high pressure systems over the Pacific Ocean that intensify during summer months, there is often little or no cloud cover during the summer. The months July through September offer the most favorable weather for viewing or climbing this peak.

Recreation
While not a particularly technical climb, Mount Johnson is a steep and exposed class 4 scramble. It's one of several mountaineering objectives in the Royal Basin area.

Gallery

References

External links

 
 Mount Johnson photo: Flickr

Mountains of Washington (state)
Olympic Mountains
Mountains of Jefferson County, Washington
Landforms of Olympic National Park
North American 2000 m summits